Snow Prince is South Korean boy band SS501's second mini-album. It was released six months after their debut, on December 5, 2005 by DSP Media. The album has a winter season-themed feeling, particularly their lead track, "Snow Prince".

The next year, 2006, their single, "Snow Prince" received two music program awards on M! Countdown for two weeks: January 5 and 19.

Track listing

Music videos
 "Snow Prince"
 "Fighter"

References

External links

 
 

SS501 albums
2005 EPs